Djairo Guedes de Figueiredo (academic signature: D. G. De Figueiredo, born on 2 April 1934, in Limoeiro do Norte) is a Brazilian mathematician noted for his researches on differential equations, elliptic operators, and calculus of variations. He is considered the greatest analyst from Brazil. He was the president of the Brazilian Mathematical Society from 1977 to 1979.

Figueiredo is a well-known figure among mathematicians in analysis and differential equations and among Brazilian students in physics, engineering and mathematics. He has received many Brazilian national and international prizes, both for his research in pure mathematics and also for his popular mathematics textbooks (about analysis and differential equations) and expository writing papers. In 1995 he received the National Order of Scientific Merit and in 2004 the title of "Doctor Honoris Causa" from the Federal University of Paraíba. In 2009 he became a member of the National Academy of Science of Buenos Aires. In 2011 he became the first Brazilian to receive a gold medal from the Telesio-Galilei Academy of Sciences from Great Britain "
for his great contribution to Mathematics, especially to the theory of elliptical partial differential equations".

He was a Ph.D. student of Louis Nirenberg at New York University, and is currently a titular professor at UNICAMP, a position he earned in 1989.

He is a recipient of Brazil's National Order of Scientific Merit in mathematics (1995). Since 1969 he has been a member of the Brazilian Academy of Sciences.

Selected papers 
D. G. de Figueiredo, P. L. Lions, R. D. Nussbaum. "A priori estimates and existence of positive solutions of semilinear elliptic equations", Journal de Mathématiques Pures et Appliquées, 61, 1982, pp. 41–63.
D. G. de Figueiredo, P. L. Felmer . "On superquadratic elliptic systems", Transactions of the American Mathematical Society, v. 343, n. 1, 1994, pp. 99–116.
P. Clément, D. G. de Figueiredo . "Positive solutions of semilinear elliptic systems", Communications in Partial Differential Equations, v. 17, n. 5–6., 1992, pp. 923–940.

The book Selected Papers of Djairo Guedes Figueiredo has been published by Springer, as part of the collection “Selected Works of Outstanding Brazilian Mathematicians”. (Google Preview)

Books 
Análise I (1975, in Portuguese)
Análise de Fourier e Equações Diferenciais Parciais (1977, in Portuguese)
Equações Diferenciais Aplicadas (1979, in Portuguese)
Números Irracionais e Transcendentes (1974, in Portuguese)
Equações Elípticas não Lineares (1977, in Portuguese)
Lectures on the Ekeland Variational Principle with Applications and Detours (Springer Verlag, 1989)

References 

New York University alumni
Living people
1934 births
Textbook writers
Academic staff of the State University of Campinas
Mathematical analysts
Members of the Brazilian Academy of Sciences
20th-century Brazilian mathematicians
21st-century Brazilian mathematicians